Admiral Sir Nathaniel Bowden-Smith  (21 January 1838 – 28 April 1921) was a Royal Navy officer who served as Commander-in-Chief, The Nore.

Naval career
Bowden-Smith joined the Royal Navy in 1852. He took part in the Second Anglo-Burmese War later that year and in the Crimean War in 1855.

He was present at the Battle of Fatshan Creek in 1857 and at the attack on the Peiho Forts in 1858 during the Second Opium War.

Promoted to captain in 1872 he commanded the frigates HMS Narcissus and HMS Undaunted, the battleship HMS Hercules and the corvette HMS Amethyst. He went on to command the training ship HMS Britannia in 1883 and to be Commander-in-chief, Australia Station in 1892 and Commander-in-Chief, The Nore in 1899. He retired in 1903.

In 1905 commenting on the Battle of Port Arthur he said the "siege was distinguished by the most daring and persistent attacks [by the Japanese] and the most heroic defence [by the Russians] on record."

Family
In 1873 he married Emily Cecilia Sandeman.

Honours and awards
22 June 1897 - To celebrate the Diamond Jubilee of Queen Victoria Vice-Admiral Nathaniel Bowden-Smith is appointed a Knight Commander of the Order of the Bath.

References

|-

1838 births
1921 deaths
Knights Commander of the Order of the Bath
Royal Navy admirals
Royal Navy personnel of the Second Opium War
Royal Navy personnel of the Crimean War